Brunei and France have had diplomatic relations since 1984. Brunei has an embassy in Paris, and France has an embassy in Bandar Seri Begawan.

History 

Relations between the two countries have been established since 8 May 1984. In 1996, Hassanal Bolkiah made a first state visit to France to promoted exchanges visits between officials of the two countries.

Economic relations 
In 2011, trade between the two countries reached €10 million. Both companies from Brunei and France also explore opportunities in oil and gas industry, and French companies seeks to explore a possible joint ventures with Bruneian partners. In aviation, the Royal Brunei Airlines (RBA) has signed a 12-year engineering partnership agreement with Air France–KLM.

Security relations 
There is also a defence co-operation between Brunei and France since the signing of a memorandum of understanding in 1999.

Further reading 
 JDWC MEETING WITH FRANCE Ministry of Defence Brunei Darussalam

References 

France
Bilateral relations of France